Perth is a suburb in the Perth metropolitan region, Western Australia that includes both the central business district of the city, and a suburban area spreading north to the northern side of Hyde Park. It does not include the separate suburbs of Northbridge or Highgate. Perth is split between the City of Perth and the City of Vincent local authorities, and was named after the city of the same name in Scotland.

Built environment 
The dominant land use in Perth is commercial. Office buildings include 108 St Georges Terrace, QV.1, Brookfield Place and Central Park – the tallest building in the city and the tenth tallest in Australia.

Significant buildings 

The Perth Town Hall, built between 1868 and 1870, was designed as an administrative centre for the newly formed City of Perth. By the late 1950s the Town Hall was considered too small for the council's requirements so Council House, a modernist steel and glass building, was commissioned. Completed in 1960, Council House has divided opinions over its architectural merit. Both the Town Hall and Council House are on the Register of the National Estate.

Forrest Chase is a significant shopping precinct in the Perth central business district. It dates back over 120 years to the retail days of Perth department store Boans, and has seen many refurbishments, iterations and additions.

Demographics 
In the 2016 census, there were 11,425 people living in the suburb of Perth. 34.7% of people were born in Australia. The next most common countries of birth were England 5.4%, China 4.0%, India 2.6%, New Zealand 2.5% and Malaysia 2.3%. 50.8% of people spoke only English at home. Other languages spoken at home included Mandarin 6.6%, Cantonese 2.3%, Italian 2.3%, Korean 2.0% and Vietnamese 1.7%. The most common response for religion was "no religion" at 38.0%.

Arts and culture 

The Perth Cultural Centre includes facilities such as the Art Gallery of Western Australia, the State Library of Western Australia, the State Theatre Centre of Western Australia and the Western Australian Museum. The Perth Concert Hall is located on St Georges Terrace and His Majesty's Theatre on Hay Street.

Transport 
Three freeways service the suburb – Mitchell Freeway, Kwinana Freeway and Graham Farmer Freeway. Public transport facilities include three train stations (Perth railway station, McIver railway station, Elizabeth Quay railway station) and two bus stations (Elizabeth Quay Bus Station and Perth Busport), as well as the East Perth Terminal, servicing intrastate and interstate rail and bus services. The Elizabeth Quay Jetty is the home of Transperth ferry services. Perth is served by four free Central Area Transit (CAT) bus routes and a number of open and high rise public car parks.
The main east–west streets through the city block are St Georges Terrace, Hay Street, Murray Street and Wellington Street. The main north–south streets are Barrack Street and William Street. Five streets have had sections converted to pedestrian malls: Murray Street, Hay Street, James Street, Museum Street and Forrest Place.

Education 
Three educational institutions are located within the suburb: St George's Anglican Grammar School, Kingston International College, and the Central Institute of Technology.

Sport 
Sporting facilities in the suburb include Perth Oval, the home ground of association football (soccer) team Perth Glory and Super Rugby team Western Force. Between 1910 and 1999 it was the home of Australian rules football team East Perth. At the western end of Wellington Street is the Perth Arena, an indoor stadium designed to host indoor sports such as tennis and basketball. The Perth Entertainment Centre, which was located adjacent to the new Arena, was the home court for the Perth Wildcats between 1990 and 2002. Tennis clubs are located at Robertson Park and Loton Park.

References 

Suburbs of Perth, Western Australia

Central business districts in Australia